Kurgan Airport  is an airport in Russia located 6 km northeast of Kurgan. It handles medium-sized airliners.

Airlines and destinations

Statistics

External links
 Kurgan Airport Official Site
 Kurgan Airport flight schedule
 Kurgan Aviation Museum

References

Airports built in the Soviet Union
Airports in Kurgan Oblast